Solitary Geyser is a fountain-type geyser in Yellowstone National Park, located above the Upper Geyser Basin. Eruptions last about a minute and are four to eight minutes apart; most eruptions are less than six feet (1.8 m) in height. It is very distinctive with clear blue water underneath and a base that is tinted orange. Solitary Geyser is accessible via the Observation Point loop trail behind Old Faithful.

Originally this geyser was a hot spring known as Solitary Spring, which did not erupt. When water was diverted to a swimming pool, the water level was lowered sufficiently to cause eruptions. Since then the diversion of water has been stopped and the water has returned to its previous level, but eruptions continue.

Notes

Geothermal features of Yellowstone National Park
Geysers of Wyoming
Geothermal features of Teton County, Wyoming
Geysers of Teton County, Wyoming